Owneq Yelqi or Uneq Yelqi may refer to:
 Owneq Yelqi-ye Olya
 Owneq Yelqi-ye Sofla